Armando Lulaj, born in 1980 in Albania, is a writer of plays, texts on risk territory, film author, and producer of conflict images. His research is orientated towards accentuating the border between economic power, fictional democracy and social disparity in a global context. Lulaj is the co-founder of DebatikCenter of Contemporary Art. He lives and works in Tirana, Albania.

Works
In 2015 he represented Albania at the Venice Biennale with the Albanian Trilogy: A Series of Devious Stratagems project. In 2019 together with Marco Mazzi he published the book "CONTROL" (Silvana Editoriale). The same book translated into English and Japanese, under the title "Broken Narrative: The Politics of Contemporary Art in Albania", is being published by Punctum Books in 2021.

References

External links
 debatikcenter.net

People from Tirana
Albanian artists
Living people
1980 births